Harry Allen Overstreet (October 25, 1875 – August 17, 1970) was an American writer and lecturer, and a popular author on modern psychology and sociology.  His 1949 book, The Mature Mind, was a substantial best-seller that sold over 500,000 copies by 1952.

Overstreet was born in San Francisco, California, on 25 October 1875. He attended the University of California receiving his B.A. degree in 1899. He taught at Berkeley until 1911. From 1911 to 1936, he was chair of Department of Philosophy and Psychology at City College of New York. Overstreet also taught in the continuing education program of the New School for Social Research.  He lectured and worked frequently with his second wife, Bonaro Overstreet.

Published works 
Overstreet, H. A. 1925. Influencing human behavior. New York: W.W. Norton.
Overstreet, H. A. 1927. About ourselves: psychology for normal people. New York: W.W. Norton & Co.
Overstreet, H. A. 1931. The enduring quest, a search for a philosophy of life. New York: W.W. Norton & Company, Inc.
Overstreet, H. A. 1933. We move in new directions. New York: W.W. Norton.
Overstreet, H. A., and Bonaro W. Overstreet. 1938. Town meeting comes to town. New York: Harper & Brothers.
Overstreet, H. A.  1939 Let Me Think. Macmillan Company
Overstreet, H. A., and Bonaro W. Overstreet. 1941. Leaders for adult education. New York: American Association for Adult Education.
Overstreet, H. A. 1941. Our free minds. New York: W.W. Norton & Company, Inc.
Overstreet, H. A. 1949. The mature mind. New York: W. W. Norton.
Overstreet, H. A. 1952. The Great Enterprise Relating Ourselves To Our World.  New York: W. W. Norton.
Overstreet, H. A., and Bonaro W. Overstreet. 1958. What we must know about communism. New York: Norton.
Overstreet, H. A., and Bonaro W. Overstreet. 1964. The strange tactics of extremism. New York: Norton.
Overstreet, H. A. 1969. A guide to civilized leisure. Freeport, N.Y.: Books for Libraries Press.
Overstreet, H. A., and Bonaro W. Overstreet. 1969. The FBI in our open society. New York: Norton.

References

External links 
Overstreet's FBI files, hosted at the Internet Archive:
Part 1
Part 1A
Part 2
Part 3
Part 4
Part 5
 "Harry Overstreet", Spartacus Educational

City College of New York faculty
1875 births
1970 deaths
University of California, Berkeley alumni
20th-century American philosophers